Septogloeum potentillae is an ascomycete fungus that is a plant pathogen infecting strawberries. The species' validity is considered unconfirmed by GBIF, as it has very few occurrences, and has not been described in published literature for over a century.

References

External links 
 USDA ARS Fungal Database

Fungal strawberry diseases
Fungi described in 1896
Ascomycota enigmatic taxa